The Batanes National Science High School, formerly the Batanes National High School, is a public science high school in the Philippines, recognized by the Department of Education. It is in the provincial capital of Batanes, Basco and had an enrollment of 1,112 students in school year 2022–2023. The current principal is Carmen C. Noguera.

History
The offering of Secondary Education was initiated by the Provincial Board of Batanes during the term of Governor Vicente Barsana. Still, it was stopped when the Governor died in a shipwreck on a trip to Itbayat. However, in June 1917, with Lucas Gonzalo as Governor, the Batanes High School was formally opened, having the following teacher Mr. Eligio Llanes, Mr. Elpidio Fadri, and Mr. Francisco Asidao. The subjects taught were Mathematics, Science, English, and military science for boys.

During the first year of establishment, only 1st year level was opened, followed by the other curriculum years so that by 1928, the Batanes High School graduated its first batch of 10 students who finished the course. These were Felix Agusto, Antonio Alcantara, Fernando Baroña, and Jose Baroña, all four from Ivana; and Francsisco Elep, Custodio Villalva, Pedro Hontomin, and Cirilo Faberes who were from Sabtang and a lone female student from San Fabian Pangasinan, Concordia Erefe. The school was closed during the war but reopened in June 1945.

In 1958, the 2-2 plan curriculum was offered to its students, later followed by the Revised Education Program in 1958. Because of financial constraints in running a secondary school, Congressman Jorge Abad sponsored R.A. 4049, converting the school to a National High School, thus, successfully turning over the burden of running the Secondary School to the National Government.

This conversion paved the way for the opening of a branch school in Itbayat with Mr. Orlando E. Hontomin as Head Teacher, followed by one in Ivana in 1967 with Mrs. Severa J. Adalid as Head, then in Mahatao in 1977 with Bernardo Hornedo as Teacher-in-charge. These branch schools eventually became full-fledged high schools, with Itbayat becoming the Itbayat National Agricultural High School with Mr. Bonifacio P. Caan as first principal, the Ivana National High School with Mr. Nicanor Aguto as principal, and the Mahatao National High School with Mr. Reinfredo F. Mirabueno, principal.

All of these schools offered the Revised Secondary Education Curriculum graduating its students and managing their finances. Itbayat National High School offers an Agricultural High School Curriculum as mandated in its establishment.

On August 22, 2000, the bill sponsored by Congressman Florencio B. Abad – R.A. 8855 was finally passed by Congress and Approved by President Joseph Ejercito Estrada, formally converting the Batanes National High School into the Batanes National Science High School. It started operation as a special science high school during the school year 2001–2002.

In 2016, the Batanes National Science High School established the offering of the Senior High School, adding grade 11 for the school year 2016-2017 and grade 12 for its succeeding year under the Republic Act 10533, known as the Enhanced Basic Education Act of 2013.

From the original 3 Teachers headed by a teacher-in-charge in 1917, the school now has 70 teachers and staff headed by a Secondary School Principal as of August 2022. It offers Special Science Education Program (SSEP) and Special Program for Journalism (SPJ) in Junior High School. For Senior High School, it offers the following strands: Science, Technology, Engineering, and Mathematics (STEM); Accounting, Business, and Management (ABM); and General Academic Strand (GAS). A historical marker was granted to this institution by the National Historical Commission of the Philippines in 2014.

Principals of the School

The school logo 

The original logo of the school was designed by Jimmy D. Verana, a former Master Teacher II of the school. It was later re-designed by Kym Clyde H. Moro, the current Head Teacher I of the school in June 2019, and has the following interpretations:

Curved flaming torch – represents the feelings of comfort and ease, as well as the smooth and continuous education serving as a beacon of light that enables one to see the path towards a brighter future from ignorance.

Two red flames – simply represent the Junior High School and Senior High School to which the school is currently catering.

Laurel leaves – stands for knowledge and learning, continuously bringing honor and fame and recognizing the school, teachers, and students’ achievements that are geared toward its mission and vision.

Maroon rounded shapes – signifies the six municipalities of the province – the BISUMI (Basco, Ivana, Sabtang, Uyugan, Mahatao, Itbayat), acknowledging its alumni from the aforementioned municipalities since its establishment and will continue to welcome students all over the province.

School Facade – conveys the school’s uniqueness and year of establishment, standing out from other schools in the province, being the only Science High school, thus, creating a point of distinction.

Test tube, atom, book, and monitor – further emphasize the institution being a science high school, inclined on the following specializations: Science and Technology, Mathematics, and Language & Communication Arts.

The golden-yellow background – shows that the school embodies generosity and compassion, as well as success, achievement, and triumph.

The green slanted lines – represents consistency and fairness as it denotes growth and renewal to all personnel and students of the institution.

Rope circle – suggests close relationship and cooperation of the student, school personnel, and its stakeholders to promote quality education to Ivatan learners.

Enrollment data of the school 
The learner information system reveals the following student enrollee from school year 2018 - 2019 up to present.

References

External links
Batanes National Science High School profile from the Department of Education

Science high schools in the Philippines
Schools in Batanes